Alhak (also Romanized as Elhak) is a village in Howmeh-ye Gharbi Rural District, in the Central District of Izeh County, Khuzestan Province, Iran. At the 2006 census, its population was 112, in 19 families.

References 

Populated places in Izeh County